Wangen may refer to:

Places

Germany
 Wangen im Allgäu, Ravensburg district, Baden-Württemberg
 Wangen (Göppingen), Göppingen district, Baden-Württemberg
 Wangen, Saxony-Anhalt, a municipality in the Burgenland district, Saxony-Anhalt
 Wangen, Stuttgart, a borough of the city of Stuttgart

Switzerland
 Wangen an der Aare, Canton of Bern (Wangen BE)
 Wangen District, named after Wangen an der Aare
 Wangen bei Olten, Canton of Solothurn (Wangen SO)
 Wangen, Schwyz, Canton of Schwyz (Wangen SZ)
 Wangen-Brüttisellen, Canton of Zürich (Wangen ZH)

Other
 Wangen, Bas-Rhin, Bas-Rhin department, France
 Wangen, Indonesia, a village in Polanharjo, Klaten, Central Java, Indonesia

People
 Frederick von Wangen (? - 1218), a Prince-Bishop of Trento

See also
 FC Wangen bei Olten, a Swiss football club based in Wangen bei Olten
 Walliswil bei Wangen